FHI may refer to:

 Family Health International, now FHI 360
 Food for the Hungry International
 Franklin Humanities Institute at Duke University
 Fritz Haber Institute of the Max Planck Society in Berlin, Germany
 Fuchs heterochromic iridocyclitis
 Fuji Heavy Industries
 Future of Humanity Institute, an interdisciplinary research centre at the University of Oxford investigating big-picture questions about humanity and its prospects.
 Heist railway station, in Belgium
 Fédération Haltéphile International, now the International Weightlifting Federation
 Norwegian Institute of Public Health (Folkehelseinstituttet)